The men's lightweight event was part of the boxing programme at the 1928 Summer Olympics.  The weight class was the fourth-lightest contested, and allowed boxers of up to 135 pounds (61.2 kilograms). The competition was held from August 7, 1928 to August 11, 1928.

Results

References

External links
 International Olympic Committee medal database
 Amateur Boxing

Lightweight